The Harbin Institute of Technology (abbreviation: HIT or ) is a public research university and a member of China's elite C9 League and a member of the University Alliance of the Silk Road.  HIT is a Chinese Ministry of Education Class A Double First Class University.  It has three campuses, spanning the country from north to south: the Harbin campus in Heilongjiang Province, the Weihai campus in Shandong Province and the Shenzhen campus in Guangdong Province. HIT sometimes known as China's MIT or MIT of China due to its dominant reputation in Science & Engineering research within China. 

HIT is consistently ranked as one of the top universities in the country with a focus on science and engineering. HIT has been ranked in the top 10 Best Global Universities for Engineering by the U.S. News & World Report Best Global Universities Ranking since the ranking’s inception in 2014 by the US News & World Reports. As of 2022, it is ranked 5th globally. HIT is one of the only handful of universities in the world that have designed, built, and launched their own satellites and it excels at missile technology.

HIT consistently features in the top 250th global universities as ranked by the Academic Ranking of World Universities, the QS World University Rankings, and the U.S. News & World Report.

History 

Key honors include the following:
 In 1920, the Harbin Institute of Technology was originally established as the Harbin Sino-Russian School for Industry to educate railway engineers. 
 In 1931, postgraduate students were enrolled from the spring of 1931.
 In 1935, during the Japanese invasion of China, the university fell under Japanese control.
 On January 1, 1938, the name Harbin Institute of Technology was reinstated, which it has retained until the present. 
 In 1945, after the Japanese defeated in World War II and evacuated, HIT was headed by the Zhongchang Railway Bureau and jointly managed by China and the Soviet Union.
 In 1949, Harbin Institute of technology recruited graduate students from all over the country. It is one of the earliest institutions to train postgraduates in China. 
 In 1951, HIT was approved by the central government to become one of the two institutions of higher learning to learn advanced techniques from the USSR. HIT enjoyed a reputation as the 'Cradle for Engineers'.
 In 1954, HIT was established as one of six national key universities of China, the only one outside Beijing.
 In 1984, HIT became one of 15 national major investment universities of China. In 1984, HIT became one of the first 22 universities to establish a graduate school. 
 In 1996, HIT was established as a first-class university under Project 211 (a project of National Key Universities initiated by the Ministry of Education of the People's Republic of China).
 In 1998, HIT was among the first 9 universities to be invited to join the Project 985 Club (a Chinese higher education system that provides funding priority to 39 leading research comprehensive universities).
 In 2000, Harbin Institute of Technology merged with Harbin University of Architecture, one of the famous eight old schools in China with the same roots, and formed a new Harbin Institute of Technology.
 In 2009, the Chinese C9 League was established by the Chinese central government, comprising a group of the top nine Chinese universities: Peking University, Tsinghua University, Harbin Institute of Technology, Fudan University, Nanjing University, Shanghai Jiao Tong University, University of Science and Technology of China, Xi'an Jiao Tong University and Zhejiang University.
 In 2012, HIT was listed in the Universities and Colleges Innovation Promotion Plan, the most recent national advanced innovation alliance.
 In 2013, the results of the third round of discipline assessment were announced. The school has 16 first-level disciplines ranked in the top five in the country, and 25 disciplines rank among the top ten in the country; among them, the first-level discipline of mechanics ranks first in the nation. 
 In 2017, HIT was ranked as Class A (top tier) university in the Double First Class University Plan, the most recent elite Chinese universities program.

University system and campuses

One University, Three Campuses 
In 1985 HIT established a new campus in Weihai; then in 2000 Harbin University of Architecture merged into HIT in Harbin. In 2002 HIT found a new graduate school in Shenzhen. These three campuses form the Greater HIT structure.
 Harbin Main Campus: located in the heavy industrial base area of China, specializes in engineering and especially defense, aerospace, mechanical, civil,  environmental, and material engineering.
 Weihai Campus: based in the national high-tech park of China, offers courses in science and technology and especially marine science, chemistry, biotechnology, automotive, software, computer, and management.
 Shenzhen Campus: situated in the University Town of Shenzhen in collaboration with Peking University, Tsinghua University, and Hong Kong universities for research, applications, and production.

Harbin Campus (Main Campus) 
The institute's main building is a smaller version of the main building of the Lomonosov Moscow State University with the majority of the buildings constructed during the time of Sino-Soviet friendship from 1949 to 1959 when the Soviet Union were actively involved in the development of Northeast China.
The School of Architecture is located on No.66 of XiDazhi Street, near the Main Building. It originally belonged to HIT; however, when HIT was divided into three institutes in 1959, it was used by the Harbin Architectural and Civil Engineering Institute. After the integration of Harbin University of Architecture (formerly Harbin Architectural and Civil engineering Institute) into HIT, the building was renamed the "Civil Building", although it houses the  school of architecture.

The No.2 campus in Harbin was originally a campus of the Harbin University of Architecture. All undergraduate students have spent their first year at this campus since 2003. School shuttles between two campuses are provided free of charge.

Weihai Campus 

Weihai campus is located in Weihai's Torch Hi-Tech Science Park, a scenic seaside city on the Jiaodong Peninsula.

The campus, along with the picturesque scenery and mild climate, adjoins the sea (Golden Beach) and is surrounded by mountains. It is ranked in the best 50 universities in satisfaction degree in China.

HIT, Weihai now has 10 schools and 1 department, 10,466 undergraduate students, 542 master students, 110 Ph.D. candidates, 89 international students, and 861 staff members, including 97 professors and 219 associate professors. HIT, Weihai provides 37 bachelor programs and shares HIT's 22 master programs and 18 doctoral programs, with the same HIT educational standards. Complementing to the Harbin campus, HIT, Weihai has developed with the characteristic disciplines such as Marine Science and Ocean Engineering, Automotive Engineering, and the highlights in the domains of Advanced Manufacturing, Information Technology and Electric Engineering, Computer Science and Software Engineering, Material Science and Engineering.

Shenzhen Campus 

Along with Tsinghua University and Peking University's graduate schools, the HIT Shenzhen Graduate School occupies  of space within Shenzhen University Town. The Shenzhen Campus covers a total floor space of  including teaching, research, administration, conference centers, student housing, and cafeteria.

Administration and organization 
Harbin Institute of Technology is organized into 20 full-time schools, which hold 73 undergraduate degree programs, 143 master programs, and 81 doctorate programs. Though most of HIT's schools focus on science and engineering, several schools offer courses in humanities, social sciences, and management. HIT does not have agriculture or medical school.

Academics 
HIT operates on a year-round schedule that includes both a fall, a spring, and a summer semester. Winter and summer holidays are scheduled to occur between semesters. During vacation periods, the dormitories and select dining halls remain open for students.

Program 
The Harbin campus of HIT offers 86 undergraduate degrees across its eighteen schools along with 41 master programs, 29 doctoral programs and 24 post-doctoral research programs.

 School of Architecture
 School of Astronautics
 School of Chemistry and Chemical Engineering
 School of Civil Engineering
 School of Computer Science and Technology
 School of Economy and Management
 School of Electrical Engineering and Automation
 School of Electronics and Information Engineering
 School of Energy Science and Engineering
 School of International Studies
 School of Life Science and Technology
 School of Marxism
 School of Material Science and Engineering
 School of Mechatronics Engineering
 School of Transportation Science and Technology
 School of Science
 School of Environment
 School of Humanities, Social Science & Law

As of 2019, there were 15,675 undergraduate students, 6,518 doctoral students and 9,680 master graduate students at the Harbin campus, including 1,984 international students from 128 countries and regions.

Rankings 

For 2022, HIT was ranked 196 by U.S. News & World Report and 217 by QS World University Rankings. In 2020, it was ranked in the 101-150 band by Academic Ranking of World Universities. 

Internationally, HIT is regarded as one of the most reputable Chinese universities by the Times Higher Education World Reputation Rankings where it ranked 126th globally. HIT graduates are highly desired worldwide, with its Graduate Employability rankings placed at # 143 globally in the 2021 Global Employability University Ranking by Times Higher Education.

Nationally, HIT is consistently ranked among China's top-10 research comprehensive universities and ranked No.1 in Northeast China region, which includes the province of Liaoning, Jilin, and Heilongjiang with a combination of more than 100 million population.

Subject rankings 
HIT has been ranked in the top 10 Best Global Universities for Engineering by the U.S. News & World Report Best Global Universities Ranking since the ranking’s inception in 2014 by the US News & World Reports. As of 2022, it is ranked 5th globally in Engineering.

Research 

Research at Harbin Institute of Technology spans a broad range of topics with a strong focus on engineering sciences. A 2009 analysis of research citations by Thomson Reuters Essential Science Indicators found HIT among the top 1% of institutions in the fields of Material Science, Chemistry, Engineering and Physics, and ninth in the number of theses published in the area of material science worldwide.

HIT is one of the Seven Sons of National Defence.

HIT completed the "Large-Size Vacuum Container Ground Simulation Equipment" project, an important national scientific research project.

Research teams 
Harbin Institute of Technology has a high-level research faculty with over 2,900 full-time teachers and researchers, including 1,950 professors and associate professors, 41 academicians of the Chinese Academy of Sciences and the Chinese Academy of Engineering, nearly 640 doctoral supervisors. It has 12 principal scientists working on Projects 973 and 13 "Young Experts with Prominent Contributions to the Country".

Laboratories and facilities 
HIT currently has 7 State Key Laboratories and 3 National Engineering Laboratories granted and funded by National Natural Science Foundation of China, National Development and Reform Commission, and State Council of China.
 State Key Laboratory of Advanced Welding and Joining
 State Key Laboratory of Urban Water Resource and Environment
 State Key Laboratory of Robotics and System

HIT also has 40 national key disciplines granted by the Ministry of Education P.R.C and 30 provincial / ministerial-level key laboratories.

Research expenditures 
With a strong emphasis on scientific research, HIT has been bold and innovative in its scientific research and has consistently undertaken large-scale and highly sophisticated national projects. Because of this, funding for research increases yearly. In 2018, the total research funding from the government, industry, and business sectors reached 3.76 billion RMB yuan (about 537 million US dollars). The Harbin campus owned 3.2 billion yuan, the Shenzhen campus owned 443 million yuan, and the Weihai campus owned 132 million yuan. Some media reported that the total research expenditures of HIT reached 7.47 billion RMB yuan (about 1.07 billion US dollars) in 2019.

Contributions 
Its faculty and students have invented many 'firsts' in China: the first analog computer in 1957, the first digital computer in 1958, the first intelligent chess computer, the first arc welding robot, the first world-class new system radar, the first IC CMOS chip with its own copyright, the first superway, computer real-time 3D image creation system, and the first high-performance computer controlled fiber twister. HIT undertakes research covered by official secrets (e.g. in space science and defense-related technologies). It made the largest contribution to the success of the Shenzhou series spacecraft and Kuaizhou series spacecraft. One minor planet (#55838) is named after the Harbin Institute of Technology and nicknamed "Hagongda Star" by the International Astronomical Union for HIT's achievements in science and engineering.

HIT is known to have close links to the People's Liberation Army and the space program of China as one of the main universities in China for space and defense-related research. HIT has made major contributions to the Chinese Shenzhou spacecraft project. In 2010, the Astronautics Innovation Research Center was established at HIT in conjunction with the China Aerospace Science and Technology Corporation. The establishment is the biggest investment of this class in China. In May 2020, the United States Bureau of Industry and Security added to HIT to the Entity List for its alleged activities in support of the People's Liberation Army.

The faculty, staff, and students at HIT have led the research and development of 20 satellites, which include:
 Experimental satellites: Shiyan-1 (launched in 2004), Shiyan-3 (launched in 2008) and XJS-E (launched in 2020).
 Quick response and rescue satellites: Kuaizhou-1 (launched in 2013) and Kuaizhou-2 (established in 2014).
 Lunar orbiters and smashers: Longjiang-1 and Longjiang-2 (launched in 2018).
 Satellites developed by students: LilacSat-1, LilacSat-2, and CE-4 (launched in 2015 and 2018).

Notable faculty and alumni

Academia and education 
 Chen Guangxi, computer scientist and professor who founded the discipline of computer science in HIT.
 Fang Binxing, computer scientist, former president of Beijing University of Posts and Telecommunications, chief designer of Great Firewall of China.
 Liu Yongtan, radar technology and signal processing expert, member of Chinese Academy of Sciences and Chinese Academy of Engineering, and winner of Highest Science and Technology Award in 2018.
 Ma Zuguang, an expert in optoelectronic technology and a former member of the Chinese Academy of Sciences.
 Yang Shuzi, engineer, member of Chinese Academy of Sciences, former president of Huazhong University of Science and Technology.

Business and entrepreneurship 
 Li Shufu, billionaire businessman, chairman of Zhejiang Geely Holding Group Co. Ltd. and Volvo Cars.
 Yuan Jinhua, co-founder of SANY Group, the sixth-largest heavy equipment manufacturer in the world.
 Zhang Jian, co-founder of Broad Group.
 Zhang Siming, founder, and CEO of Shenzhen Neptunus Pharmaceutical Company Limited.

Engineering and technology 
 Song Jian, aerospace engineer, former president of Chinese Academy of Engineering, member of Chinese Academy of Sciences and Chinese Academy of Engineering, and a foreign member of US National Academy of Engineering, Russian Academy of Sciences, and the Royal Swedish Academy of Engineering Sciences.
 Sun Jiadong, rocket and satellite technology expert, chief designer for Chinese Lunar Exploration Program, and member of Chinese Academy of Sciences and International Academy of Astronautics.

Politics and government 
 Li Changchun, former senior leader of Chinese Communist Party, member of the Politburo Standing Committee, and Chairman of the CCP Central Guidance Commission for Building Spiritual Civilization.
 Li Jinai, general in the People's Liberation Army, and director of the General Political Department of the PLA.
 Li Zhanshu, member of the Politburo Standing Committee, and Chairman of the Standing Committee of the National People's Congress.
 Ma Xingrui, member of the Politburo and party secretary of Xinjiang, aerospace engineer, former vice president of HIT, and former director of China National Space Administration.
 Sun Yun-suan, former Premier of the Republic of China, and chief architects of Taiwan's "Economic Miracle".
 Wang Zhaoguo, former governor of Fujian, former head of the United Front Work Department, and former vice-chairman of the CPPCC.
 Xu Dazhe, governor of Hunan province, aerospace engineer, and former chief administrator of China National Space Administration.
 Zhang Chunxian, vice-chairperson of the Standing Committee of the National People's Congress.

Sports and arts 
 Kong Linghui, table tennis player, gold medal winner of Summer Olympic Games and World Table Tennis Championships.
 Shi Kang, writer, scriptwriter.

See also
 APRU
 Project 985
 Project 211
 Plan 111

References

External links 

  

Harbin Institute of Technology
Educational institutions established in 1920
Project 211
Project 985
Plan 111
Universities and colleges in Harbin
Technical universities and colleges in China
C9 League
1920 establishments in China